Donghai County is under the administration of Lianyungang, Jiangsu province, China. It borders the prefecture-level cities of Linyi (Shandong) to the north and Xuzhou to the west.

The county has 300 million tons of quartz and 300,000 tons of rock crystal reserves, which is the highest in China, so it is nicknamed "the county of rock crystal".

Administrative divisions
In the present, Donghai County has 2 subdistricts,11 towns and 8 townships. 
2 subdistricts

11 towns

8 townships

Climate

References

www.xzqh.org

External links

County-level divisions of Jiangsu
Lianyungang